Rodney Martin (born December 22, 1982) is an American sprinter. Martin is a native of Las Vegas, Nevada. He attended Western High School, where he played football and ran track. At the University of South Carolina Rodney became a three-time All-American and broke the indoor and outdoor 200m school records. Martin ran 4th place at the 2007 World Championships in Osaka, Japan in the 200m dash, missing the bronze medal to Wallace Spearmon Jr. by 100th of a second. The Americans placed 1st (Tyson Gay), 3rd place (Wallace Spearmon Jr) and 4th place (Rodney Martin). Martin obtained the gold medal as an alternate running on the gold medal USA 4 × 100 m relay that year. Martin made his first Olympic Team in 2008 in Beijing China, where he ran the first leg of the 4 x 100 metre relay. Rodney has now turned his sights on Music, forming King Martin Music Group out of Houston Tx. 

United States at the 2008 Summer Olympics in Beijing. He competed in the 4x100 metres relay together with Travis Padgett, Darvis Patton and Tyson Gay. In their qualification heat Martin ran the first leg of the race. They did not finish due to a mistake in the baton exchange and they were eliminated.

, Martin was serving in the United States Navy.

Personal bests

Outdoor

Indoor

References

External links

 
 

1982 births
American male sprinters
Athletes (track and field) at the 2008 Summer Olympics
Living people
Olympic track and field athletes of the United States
Sportspeople from Las Vegas
South Carolina Gamecocks men's track and field athletes
Track and field athletes from Nevada
World Athletics Championships winners